Micrelaps vaillanti, also known commonly as the black-headed micrelaps or the Somali two-headed snake, is a species of venomous rear-fanged snake in the family Lamprophiidae. The species is endemic to Africa.

Etymology
The specific name, vaillanti, is in honor of French herpetologist Léon Vaillant.

Geographic range
M. vaillanti is found in Ethiopia, Kenya, Somalia, eastern Sudan, Tanzania, and Uganda.

Habitat

Description
M. vaillanti is brown dorsally, with the center of each dorsal scale grayish white. The ventrals are brown in the middle, and whitish on the sides.

The dorsal scales are smooth, without pits, and are arranged in 15 rows at midbody (in 17 rows on the neck). The ventrals number 171-203. The anal plate is divided, and the subcaudals are also divided.

The head is very flattened. The rostral is large, twice as broad as deep, the portion visible from above about ⅔ as long as its distance from the frontal. The internasals are twice as broad as long, and twice as long as the prefrontals. The frontal is small, 1½ times as long as broad, as long as its distance from the end of the snout, much shorter than the parietals. The supraocular is as long as broad. There is one very small postocular. The temporals are arranged 1+1. There are seven upper labials, the third in contact with the prefrontal, the third and fourth (or third, fourth, and fifth) entering the eye. There are four lower labials in contact with the anterior chin shield. The two pairs of chin shields (anterior and posterior) are subequal in size.

Reproduction
M. vaillanti is oviparous.

References

Further reading
Mocquard F (1888).  "Sur une collection de reptiles et de batraciens rapportés des pays somalis et de Zanzibar par M [onsieur]. G. Révoil ". Mémoires Publiés par la Société Philomatique à l'occasion du Centenaire de sa fondation 1788-1888, Paris. pp. 109–134. (Elaposchema vaillanti, new species, p. 123 + Plate XII, figure 1). (in French).
Largen M, Spawls S (2010). Amphibians and Reptiles of Ethiopia and Eritrea. Frankfurt am Main: Edition Chimaira / Serpents Tale. 694 pp. . (Micrelaps vaillanti, p. 586).
Spawls S, Howell K, Hinkel H, Menegon M (2018). Field Guide to East African Reptiles, Second Edition. London: Bloomsbury Natural History. 624 pp. . (Micrelaps vaillanti, p. 459).

Atractaspididae
Reptiles described in 1888